Legion of Ukrainian Sich Riflemen was a Ukrainian unit within the Austro-Hungarian Army during the First World War.

Scope 
The unit was formed in August 1914 on the initiative of the Supreme Ukrainian Council. It was composed of members of different Ukrainian paramilitary organizations in Galicia, led by Frank Schott, and participated in hostilities on the Russian front. After World War I, with Austria's disintegration, the unit became the regular military unit of the West Ukrainian People's Republic. During German and Austrian occupation of eastern (Russian) Ukraine in 1918 the unit was stationed in southern Ukraine. Former unit soldiers participated in the formation of Sich Riflemen, a military unit of the Ukrainian People's Republic. In 1919 the Ukrainian Sich Riflemen expanded into the Ukrainian Galician Army. They participated in the Polish–Ukrainian War around Lviv and suffered heavy losses. On May 2, 1920, the unit was disbanded.

Origins and formation 

A number of Ukrainian youth organizations formed in Galicia as early as 1894, the result of the growing national consciousness among Ukrainians in Galicia. In 1900, a sports/firefighting organization Sich was founded by a lawyer and social activist Kyrylo Tryliovs'kyi in Sniatyn (today's Ivano-Frankivsk Oblast), which rejuvenated the ideas of Cossack Zaporozhian Sich to foster the national patriotism among the young generation. Alongside these organizations, forming all across Galicia, parallel sports/firefighting organizations (Sokil) (Falcon) were also springing up. By 1912, many smaller Sich companies appeared in numerous Ukrainian communities. Along with these youth organizations, a Women's Organizational Committee was set up to train nurses. The Ukrainian Sich Union coordinated the activities of all local Sich companies and printed its own newspaper, "The Sich News". By the start of the First World War there were at least 2000 such organizations in Galicia and Bukovina.

In 1911, a philosophy student from Lviv, Ivan Chmola, organized a secret paramilitary group, composed of young men and women from Lviv University, Academic Gymnasium, and other local schools. These enthusiasts learned how to use firearms, prepared military manuals, translated military terminology and lobbied the Austrian authorities to legalize the Ukrainian paramilitary organizations. They were greatly influenced by the similar Polish paramilitary organizations, such as Związek Strzelecki, that were quite numerous, well-organized and — unlike the Ukrainian organizations — legal. This group later published its own newspaper, "Vidhuk", and continued to organize Lviv's Ukrainian youth. However, several attempts to legalize it were blocked by the local authorities, who were mostly Poles.

Although initially Chmola chose the name "Plast" for this formation, this group represented only one isolated attempt to organize the Ukrainian youth into a legitimate scouting movement under this name. In June 1912, Dr. Oleksandr Tysovs'kyi, a teacher at the Academic Gymnasium in Lviv, administered a ceremony, at which a group of young students under his tutelage took a scout's oath. Thus the official Ukrainian scouting organization Plast was born. Explicitly paramilitary elements were expressly excluded by the organization's constitution, written by Dr. Tysovs'kyi, because he desired to focus its efforts primarily on fostering the ideological aspect of national patriotism, as well as, of course, on advancing the standard scouting curriculum. Possessing greater authority and commanding respect in the Lviv civil society, Dr. Tysovs'kyi won the upper hand, and Ivan Chmola eventually joined efforts with him. Nevertheless, Chmola continued his efforts to train the youth, started organizing scouting camps and teaching adolescents various survival skills, orienteering in different terrains and similar useful skills based on self-reliance, discipline and, most importantly, fellowship. This initiative attracted several prominent individuals, who would later also play important roles in the creation of the Sich Riflemen — for example, Petro Franko, Ivan Franko's son. And many individuals continued to secretly train militarily, of their own accord.

Finally, Kyrylo Tryliovs'kyi translated a similar statute of a Polish paramilitary sharpshooter organization and submitted it to the Austrian authorities for approval. This time, the officials had no choice but to grant approval, and a society of "Sich Sharpshooters" (Sichovi Stril'tsi) was finally legalized in the Kingdom of Galicia and Lodomeria on 18 March 1913. The first such company was set up in Lviv, soon to be augmented by Ivan Chmola and his group. Legalization of Sich Sharpshooters gave impetus to other Ukrainian youth organizations, and the ranks of Sich, Sokil and Plast subsequently swelled up all across Western Ukraine.

In the spring of 1913, the Ukrainian Sich League was formed in Lviv, and a statute of Ukrainian Sich Sharpshooters (USS) was drafted. On 25 January 1914 the second society "Sich Sharpshooters II" was organized in Lviv, numbering over 300 members. Sich Sharpshooters I included mostly students and Sich Sharpshooters II - mostly workers and peasants. By World War I, there were 96 Sich Sharpshooter societies in Galicia alone. Plast was by then transformed into a full-fledged scouting organization with branches in many towns and villages. Many of these young scouts would continue to voluntarily join Ukrainian Sich Sharpshooter movement even well after the war was over, and future generations would also participate in the liberation struggles between the wars and in World War II. After many trials and tribulations, having survived in the Ukrainian Diaspora, Plast was reorganized in Ukraine shortly before Ukraine's independence in 1991 and continues to be the largest scouting organization in Ukraine, fostering the values of national patriotism among Ukrainian youth.

Initially there was no unanimity among the founders of the Ukrainian Sich League as to its goals: some wanted complete independence of the Ukrainian people from the Austro-Hungarian empire, and some wanted limited autonomy within the empire. The pro-Austrian faction prevailed, and only units loyal to the Habsburg monarchy were allowed to exist. From its inception, Ukrainian Sich Sharpshooters saw Russia as their main enemy and were preparing to liberate Ukrainian lands from under the yoke of Russian Empire. In Galicia and Bukovina, Sich Sharpshooters were also circulating a magazine called "Vidhuk" ("Response"). In 1914, a statute of USS was published, which established the order of service and the uniforms, provided military terminology and commands in the Ukrainian language. That same year ammunition and rifles were procured for a 10,000-strong Legion of Ukrainian Sich Sharpshooters, which participated in Lviv parade on 28 June 1914, along with all of the youth organizations - Sich, Sokil and Plast. That same day, Archduke Franz Ferdinand was assassinated in Sarajevo by a Serbian nationalist, precipitating the chain of events that led to World War I.

One month later, World War I broke out and the newly established General Ukrainian Council published in a Lviv newspaper "Dilo" the call for Galician Ukrainians to form volunteer units to fight the Russian Empire. The Ukrainian leaders in Austria-Hungary hoped that the formation of these units would advance the cause of national liberation. They also sought to dispel the suspicions of some Galician Russophiles that the Ukrainians in that area were sympathetic to Russia. The Austrian war ministry was not prepared for this initiative of the General Ukrainian Council and allowed creation of a unit with only 2,500 men. The first volunteers were mainly members of Ukrainian nationalist organizations such as Sich, Sokil and Plast.

Ranks 
Officers

Other ranks

Cultural references 

The unit is commemorated in the 1914 song "Oh, the Red Viburnum in the Meadow"

See also 
 Austro-Hungarian Army
 Sich Riflemen

References

Literature 
 Orest Subtelny. Ukraine. A history. University of Toronto press. 1994. .
 Paul Robert Magocsi. The Roots of Ukrainian Nationalism: Galicia As Ukraine's Piedmont. University of Toronto Press. 2002. .
 Encyclopedia of Ukraine on Line. Ukrainian Sich Riflemen.
 Stepan Ripets'ky. Ukrainian Sich Riflemen. Online version.

External links 
 Petro Sodol, Ukrainian Sich Riflemen in the Encyclopedia of Ukraine, vol. 5 (1993).

History of Ukraine (1795–1918)
Austro-Hungarian Army
Military units and formations of Austria-Hungary in World War I
Military units and formations of Ukraine
Aftermath of World War I in Ukraine
Establishments in the Kingdom of Galicia and Lodomeria
Ukrainian independence movement
Military units and formations established in 1914
Military units and formations disestablished in 1920
1914 establishments in Ukraine
1920 disestablishments in Ukraine
Ukraine in World War I
Ukrainian military formations